Mihail Kurtschinski (12 October 1876 Kaluga Governorate, Russia – 12 June 1939 Tartu) was an Estonian politician. He was a member of III Riigikogu.

References

1876 births
1939 deaths
Members of the Riigikogu, 1926–1929
Members of the Estonian National Assembly